Sir Harry Sedan Waechter, 1st Baronet  (6 June 1871 – 20 May 1929) was a British businessman and philanthropist.

The only son of Sir Max Waechter, Harry Sedan Waechter was born in Newcastle-on-Tyne and educated at Clifton College and Trinity College, Cambridge. started developing the garden, "Ramsnest" (now "Ramster") near Chiddingfold, Surrey, which he purchased sometime between 1890 and 1900. He also owned property in Salisbury, Southern Rhodesia (present-day Harare, Zimbabwe). He was made a partner in Bessler, Waechter & Co. in 1901. Waechter was appointed a deputy lieutenant of the County of London in September 1909.

He was raised to the Baronetage in the 1911 New Year Honours. He is described in The Times article as "Henry Waechter, Esq, Managing Director of the firm of Bessler, Waechter and Co. Limited, Shippers and Ship owners of which Sir Max Waechter is Chairman. Has given generous support to the Territorial Force and Cadet Corps in Surrey. High Sheriff of Surrey in 1910 and Master of the Chiddingfold Foxhounds." In 1907, he instituted a Band Competition, held at Ramsnest.

In 1912, he gave land in Woodbridge Road, Guildford to Guildford Borough Council, in trust, with cricket included in the objects of the Trust. This land is now the home of Guildford Cricket Club.

He served in World War I (1914–1918) in France and in Italy he received the Croix de Guerre. He was appointed a Companion of the Order of St Michael and St George in the 1919 New Year Honours for his efforts during the First World War.

Family
He married Evelyn Mary Josephine d'Arcy (died 1955), daughter of John d'Arcy, in 1911. They had two sons and a daughter. They divorced on 15 December 1923.

Death
Lord Waechter died in Salisbury, Southern Rhodesia (present-day Harare, Zimbabwe) on 20 May 1929, shortly before his 58th birthday. He was succeeded as Baronet by his son, Harry Leonard d'Arcy Waechter (born 22 May 1912–died 10 January 1985). The baronetcy became extinct upon the latter's death, in 1985.

References

1871 births
1929 deaths
People educated at Clifton College
Alumni of Trinity College, Cambridge
Baronets in the Baronetage of the United Kingdom
Companions of the Order of St Michael and St George
Recipients of the Croix de Guerre 1914–1918 (France)
Deputy Lieutenants of the County of London
English people of German descent
High Sheriffs of Surrey
Royal Artillery officers
British Army personnel of World War I